A jelly doughnut, or jam donut, is a doughnut with a Fruit preserve filling.

Varieties include the Polish pączki, the German Berliner, the Israeli sufganiyot, the southern European krafne and the Italian bombolone.

History
The first record of a jelly doughnut appeared in the Polish translation (Kuchmistrzostwo) of a German cookbook published in 1532. It is uncertain whether or not that was the precise date of the jelly doughnut's invention. Known then as Gefüllte Krapfen, it spread throughout Europe over the next century, sometimes with other fillings considering sugar and jelly was sparsely found at the time, but Caribbean sugar plantations made both more widely available.

By region

Australia

Hot jam doughnuts are popular all over Victoria.  They can be found at fairs and markets, and they are commonly sold out of food trucks.  They are similar to traditional German and American jelly doughnuts, but with more yeast in the dough and always served very hot. They are served so warm that it is common for consumers to burn their tongue on the jam.

United States

A 1942 headline in the Hartford Courant Of Connecticut reported that "Jelly Doughnut Diets Harmful to War Effort." A 1976 Los Angeles Times story explains how to make jelly doughnuts from scratch for a "tasty after-school" snack for youngsters.

In a 1997 taste test, Ruth Reichl graded jelly doughnuts from a local doughnut shop higher than ones from national chain doughnut shops.

Israel
Jelly- or custard-filled doughnuts are known as sufganiyot in Hebrew and are a popular Hanukkah treat. They are cooked in oil which is in keeping with the theme of the holiday, celebrating one day's worth of oil  "keeping a sacred lamp alight for eight."

See also

List of doughnut varieties
 List of stuffed dishes

References

External links

Doughnuts
Israeli cuisine
Jewish cuisine
American desserts
Stuffed desserts
Deep fried foods
Australian desserts
New Zealand desserts
Foods with jam